Lucien Charles Gilbert Daloz (9 October 1930 – 31 July 2012) was the archbishop of the  Roman Catholic Archdiocese of Besançon, France.

Ordained in 1955, Daloz became bishop of Langres in 1975 and archbishop of Besançon in 1980, retiring in 2003.

Notes

1930 births
2012 deaths
Archbishops of Besançon
20th-century Roman Catholic archbishops in France
21st-century Roman Catholic archbishops in France